North Carolina's 12th Senate district is one of 50 districts in the North Carolina Senate. It has been represented by Republican Jim Burgin since 2019.

Geography
Since 2023, the district has included all of Lee and Harnett counties, as well as part of Sampson County. The district overlaps with the 6th, 22nd, 51st, and 53rd state house districts.

District officeholders

Multi-member district

Single-member district

Election results

2022

2020

2018

2016

2014

2012

2010

2008

2006

2004

2002

2000

References

North Carolina Senate districts
Lee County, North Carolina
Harnett County, North Carolina
Sampson County, North Carolina